General Parsons may refer to:

Arthur Parsons (1884–1966), British Indian Army major general
Charles Parsons (British Army officer) (1855–1923), British Army acting major general
Harold Parsons (1863–1925), British Army major general
James K. Parsons (1877–1960), U.S. Army major general
Lawrence Parsons (British Army officer) (1850–1923), British Army lieutenant general
Lewis B. Parsons Jr. (1818–1907), Union Army brigadier general of volunteers 
Mosby Monroe Parsons (1822–1865), Confederate States Army brigadier general
Samuel Holden Parsons (1737–1789), Continental Army major general

See also
Attorney General Parsons (disambiguation)